International Sound Communication (frequently abbreviated as I.S.C.) was a series of compilation cassettes, compiled and distributed as a mail art project by Andi Xport from Peterborough, England, in the mid-1980s.  Fifteen volumes were issued, and it was one of the largest and most versatile series of its kind.

The series was intended to provide an outlet for any kind of music from any country in the world.  Most artists who appeared were not signed to a record label, but had released their music privately on cassettes sold via mail, and these were often the source of the material that appeared on the compilations.  All volumes came with a list of contact addresses, with the exception of artists from "Iron Curtain" or Soviet Union countries whose addresses were not published, to protect them from government persecution, as the "importation" of Western culture and influences, and communication with artists outside the Soviet Union, without government approval were generally illegal.  In those cases, a contact address for an associate outside of the Soviet Union was provided.  As stated on the inserts, "All bands and individuals featured on I.S.C. comps have more music available, so get in touch now!"  A slogan, "Communicate to Create" often appeared.

In addition to compiling the series, Andi Xport recorded under the name Man's Hate, which was also the name of his cassette label which distributed I.S.C. (plus 5 cassette albums by Man's Hate). Xport was also a member of APF Brigade, and The Peace & Freedom Band.  Xport claims that more than 3,000 tapes were sent to him, and many had to be stored under his bed due to space limitations.

Released on the same date as volume 13, an extra volume appeared as The Noise Collective which, although presented as an artist name, was actually another compilation project.  All tracks were collaborations between two or more artists, most of whom had appeared previously on I.S.C.  The collaborations were accomplished by having the artists send each other unfinished recordings through the mail.  The tracks were edited to overlap and segue, forming a continuous suite on each side of the tape.

Volumes 1 to 8 were C-60 (60-minute) tapes, with a cover price of £1.00.  The remaining volumes, including The Noise Collective, were C-90 with a cover price of £1.50.  Volumes 1 to 9 used a fold-out insert, while volume 10 had a cardboard insert separate from the track list and contacts sheet.  Starting with volume 11 (and including The Noise Collective), the outer cover was a cardboard sleeve wrapped around the plastic jewel case.

Track listings

I.S.C. No. 1 (on front)
International Sound Communication (on spine)
not dated, issued 1984 or 1985
60 minutes
Comment on cover: "Music from Belgium, England, Japan, Norway, Scotland, U.S.A. & Wales.  All the hits of the 80s on one great cassette!"

I.S.C. 2 (on front)
International Sound Communication 2 (on spine)
16 March 1985
60 minutes
Comment on cover: "Ape shit maaan!"

I.S.C. 3 (on front)
International Sound Communiqué 3 (on spine)
22 April 1985
60 minutes

I.S.C. 4
Track list not available
List of artists (from advertisement): The Klinik; Unknownmix; Bloody Hypocrites; F/i; The Dreg; Unovidual; Electro Hippies; D.V.A. Minuta Mrznje; Les Bouseaux Pychedeliques; The Affairs; If, Bwana; Anathema; Synthetic Productions; Miasma; Pseudo Code; The Submensa's; M.A.L.; Narzisse
List of countries: Belgium; England; France; Northern Ireland; Switzerland; USA; West Germany; Yugoslavia

International Sound Communication 5 (on front)
I.S.C. 5 (on spine)
27 July 1985
60 minutes

I.S.C. 6
10 October 1985
60 minutes

I.S.C. 7
Track list not available
List of artists (from advertisement): Alan Cornelius; Post War; Mystery Hearsay; Last Rites; Headcleaners; Famlende Forsok; Paranoid Visions; N.B.N.; Opera Multisteel; The Apostles; Face in the Crowd; Fever Heroes; Celestial Orgy; In ' 8; Compulsion Brothers; C'llaaps
List of countries: England; France; Ireland; Japan; Norway; Scotland; USA; Wales

International Sound Communication Compilation Volume Number Eight
1 January 1986
60 minutes

International Sound Communication Volume Number Nine
22 February 1986
90 minutes
Comment on cover: "It's like an electric chair in your living room!"

I.S.C. 10
6 April 1986
90 minutes
Comment on cover: "Stop pushing, there's enough copy's for everyone"

International Sound Communication Eleven
26 July 1986
90 minutes
Comment on cover: "What are YOU doing to protect yourself from: (Misinformation... Half-truths... Mind Rot...) MEDIA BURN, the Nation's leading mental crippler - Nothing?  Then Turn On, Tune In, And Drop Out With I.S.C."

International Sound Communication Twelve
18 October 1986
90 minutes

I S C Thirteen
21 March 1987
90 minutes
Comment on cover: "Unlucky for some"

The Noise Collective
Hello! Hello! Can Anyone Hear Me?
21 March 1987
90 minutes
Each track is a collaboration between two or more artists.

International Sound Communication Compilation Volume Number Fourteen
not dated, issued 1987
90 minutes
Comment on cover: "Load up with I.S.C., get a copy now!"

I.S.C. 15
Track list not available

See also
Cassette culture
Cassette culture 1970s–1990s

References

Music publications
Sound
1980s compilation albums
Experimental music compilation albums
Compilation album series